Michael Eugene Compton (born September 18, 1970) is a former American college and professional football player who was a guard in the National Football League (NFL) for twelve seasons.  Compton played college football for West Virginia University, and was recognized as an All-American center.  He played professionally for the Detroit Lions, New England Patriots and Jacksonville Jaguars of the NFL, and started in Super Bowl XXXVI for the Patriots.

Early years
Compton was born in Richlands, Virginia.  He graduated from Richlands High School, where he played high school football, baseball and wrestled for the Richlands Blue Tornado.

College career
Compton attended West Virginia University, and he played for the West Virginia Mountaineers football team from 1989 to 1992.  He began his college career at West Virginia in 1989 as a redshirt freshman.  Compton was backup to senior center Jeff Price that season. In 1990, Compton's sophomore season, he became the starter at the center position. His game experience from his redshirt freshman year was key in his starting success.  In 1991, as a junior, Compton was an all-Big East selection.

In 1992, his senior season, Compton earned consensus All-American honors. He was a finalist for the Lombardi Award, a first-team all-Big East selection, a selection to the CFA Scholar-Athlete Team, and a first-team Academic All-American.

In 2005, Compton was inducted into West Virginia University's Sports Hall of Fame.

Professional career
He was the starter on the offensive line, blocking for Barry Sanders during his record-setting rushing seasons. During his time with the Lions, Compton also served as the team's long snapper for field goal and point after attempts. Linebacker Allen Aldridge served as the long snapper for punt coverage.

During his NFL career, Mike Compton displayed versatility along the offensive line, often playing multiple positions in any given season.  
 In 1993, he played a reserve role at Center.  
 In 1995, he would start 2 games at LT then start 3 games at LG.  He would start at LG for the final 3 games of the season.
 In 1996, he would start 15 games at LG.
 In 1997, he would start 14 games at LGDude and start 2 games at LT.
 In 1998, he would start all 16 games at LG.
 In 1999, he would start 15 games at C and the season finale at LT.
 In 2000, he would start the opener and final 5 games at C.  In between, he started at LG.
 In 2001, he would start all 16 games at LG and take over at C in shotgun situations.
 In 2002, he would start 15 games at LG and 1 game at C.

In 2001, Compton joined the New England Patriots squad. In his three seasons with the Patriots, Compton earned two Super Bowl rings. In 2004, Compton ended his career with the Jacksonville Jaguars.

Coaching career
Compton was an assistant coach at Tazewell High School in Tazewell, Virginia during the 2006 and 2007 seasons. In 2008, he was named head football coach at Patrick Henry High School in Glade Spring, Virginia.

In 2011, Compton began his collegiate football coaching career as offensive line coach for Bluefield College.

In 2013, Compton was the offensive line coach at Fairmont State.

in 2015, Compton was the offensive line coach at Concord University.

in 2016, Compton is the offensive line coach at UVA Wise.

Compton and his family reside in Richlands, Virginia. He is married to LeTonya. Compton has three children, Jessica, Josh, and Sarah. He became a grandfather for the first time in November 2019.

References

External links
 databaseFootball.com

1970 births
Living people
All-American college football players
American football centers
American football offensive guards
Detroit Lions players
Jacksonville Jaguars players
New England Patriots players
People from Richlands, Virginia
Players of American football from Virginia
West Virginia Mountaineers football players